The 2002 America East men's basketball tournament was hosted by the Northeastern Huskies at Matthews Arena . The final was held at Case Gym on the campus of Boston University.  gained its fifth America East Championship and an automatic berth to the NCAA tournament with its win over Maine. BU was given the 16th seed in the West Regional of the NCAA Tournament and lost in the first round to Cincinnati 90–52.

Bracket and Results

See also
America East Conference

References

America East Conference men's basketball tournament
2001–02 America East Conference men's basketball season